Fred Gibson (born September 12, 1947) is an American professional golfer.

Gibson was born in Washington, D.C. He turned professional in 1977.

Gibson played on the Champions Tour from 1998 to 2004 and has one win, the 1999 Vantage Championship.

Professional wins (2)

Other wins (1)
1996 Tobago Open

Senior PGA Tour wins (1)

References

External links

2008 Senior PGA Championship profile

American male golfers
PGA Tour Champions golfers
Golfers from Washington, D.C.
Golfers from Orlando, Florida
1947 births
Living people